The Norman Brokaw House is a historic house located in Kaukauna, Wisconsin.

Description and history 
The -story house was built around 1886. Brokaw built and operated paper mills in Kaukauna and helped found a Methodist congregation there. The house was added to the National Register of Historic Places in 1984 for its industrial significance.

References

Houses completed in 1886
Houses on the National Register of Historic Places in Wisconsin
Houses in Outagamie County, Wisconsin
National Register of Historic Places in Outagamie County, Wisconsin